In enzymology, a 2'-hydroxyisoflavone reductase is an enzyme that catalyzes the chemical reaction

vestitone + NADP+  2'-hydroxyformononetin + NADPH + H+

Thus, the two substrates of this enzyme are vestitone and NADP+, whereas its 3 products are 2'-hydroxyformononetin, NADPH, and H+.

This enzyme belongs to the family of oxidoreductases, specifically those acting on the CH-CH group of donor with NAD+ or NADP+ as acceptor.  The systematic name of this enzyme class is vestitone:NADP+ oxidoreductase. Other names in common use include NADPH:2'-hydroxyisoflavone oxidoreductase, isoflavone reductase, and 2',7-dihydroxy-4',5'-methylenedioxyisoflavone reductase.

References

 

EC 1.3.1
NADPH-dependent enzymes
Enzymes of unknown structure